These are the notable characters in the Night Watch books and movies as created by Sergey Lukyanenko with Vladimir Vasilyev. They all play major or medium-sized roles in one or more of the following works:

Novels:

 Night Watch
 Day Watch
 Dusk Watch aka Twilight Watch
 Final Watch aka Last Watch
 New Watch
Sixth Watch

Stories:
"Face of the Dark Palmira" - by Vladimir Vasilyev
"The Other among Others" - by Vitaly Kaplan

Movies:

 Night Watch
 Day Watch

Computer games:

 Night Watch
 Day Watch

Characters are categorized by their affiliation when they first appear.

Light Others 

Characters with Magical abilities that have aligned themselves with the Light are called Light Others

Anton Gorodetsky 
 (Light Mage) -  The main character of Night Watch and the two movies, a main or major character in the rest of the stories (except Unauthorised Personnel Permitted) and the narrator of the tetralogy (sans Day Watch). A reluctant member of the Night Watch. In the beginning of the first book he prefers mundane, technical jobs to actual field work, initially supervising the Night Watch's IT department. The events of the series force him to step up and become a full-fledged operative. He eventually becomes an extremely powerful magician. Over time, he becomes considerably more cynical about the cause of Light Others. His favorite pastime is listening to custom mini-discs. In the novels, he uses the randomized playback feature of his player in much the same way a Taoist might throw stones to gain a rough idea of the future, for example an ominous song implying upcoming danger. Having discovered his powers 7 years (12 in the movies) prior to the series' beginning, he starts off as a relatively weak mage, only to discover unsuspected potential as time passes by, becoming a second level mage and then, affected by the Fuaran ritual, a mage Beyond Classification. Possesses a pistol with silver bullets for protection from vampires and werewolves. Day Watch (Movie): as he uses the Chalk of Fate to rewind time and corrects his biggest mistake, he becomes human without any powers or recollections of the Others.

Boris Ignatyevich/Gesar
 (Also spelled Geser and Gesser, also referred to as Boris Ignatyevich or Boris Ivanovich (depending on the print) in both movies) (Grand Light Mage) - an ancient mage of Tibetan descent who taught a number of heroes and philosophers during his lifetime. He moved to Europe during the early 15th century. Although he has had many opportunities to advance to high-level posts within Night Watch, he chooses to remain a Regional Director of the Moscow division (the Moscow division is the de facto head of all divisions of former USSR). Gesar is a battle-hardened tactician who's been known to turn devastating defeats into small victories. He cares a great deal about his subordinates, though he doesn't hesitate to put them in harm's way for the sake of the greater good. His mage level is Beyond Classification (i.e. doesn't fit into the 1-7 scale). Dusk Watch (Novel): During the course of the Dusk Watch, it was revealed that he and Olga had a son, who turned out to be mortal.

Svetlana Gorodetskaya (née Nazarova)
 (Also called Sveta) (Grand Light Sorceress) - a young doctor who is not aware of her powers at the beginning of the novels. Night Watch (Book and Movie): She is a victim of a plot by Zavulon to either kill her or depress her until she turns to the Dark before she joins the Night Watch. Her power is discovered when Zavulon goes too far and she inadvertently curses herself; Svetlana's powers are so strong that the curse develops into an enormous vortex that threatens to unleash an Inferno and destroy Moscow.  She enters into a relationship with Anton which becomes strained as Svetlana's powers continue to increase exponentially. Day Watch (Movie): She clashes with Yegor during his birthday, which starts a war between Light and Dark. Yegor attacks her with his weapon, blinding her. When Anton rewinds time and both forget what was, he meets her in a park, and shows interest in her. Twilight Watch (Novel): Svetlana and Anton eventually have a child together that is more powerful than either of them, a very rare occurrence among the others (who usually have normal, ungifted children).

Olga
 (Grand Light Sorceress) - an old friend and an occasional lover of Geser. Geser has a number of pet names for her (Olyushka, etc.) When he refers to someone whose name begins with "Ol", he is likely referring to Olga. Night Watch (Book and Movie): Olga was turned into an owl for breaking obligations she had to the Light. In the book, she was allowed to change back to her human form during wartime, for half an hour every day. In the movie, she changed back to her human form permanently after being assigned to Anton as a partner. Day Watch (Book): Thanks to Geser's manipulations, she was restored to her human form and regained her powers by the end of Night Watch. Day Watch (Movie): Geser reveals that Olga was imprisoned in an owl body by the Inquisition when she sacrificed herself to help Geser out in a difficult situation, and later Geser understood that it was the Dark Others' plan all along.

Semyon
 (Also spelled Simeon) (First-level Light Mage) - a crusty, experienced mage with a wryly cynical outlook on the world. Unlike many of his fellow mages, he is a capable fighter even without his magic. Unlike most mages, he is capable of "reading" people the same way a normal person would - by body language, as opposed to magic. In the films, he is associated with a large yellow supercharged truck to which he has an undefined connection. In the books, this connection is less distinct. However, he's still the designated driver of Night Watch parties, as he's a genius with anything that has wheels, even without his powers. In the film Day Watch, he is killed after ramming his truck through a much larger semi-truck attempting to stop him and Olga from reaching the hotel where Anton and Svetlana are stuck at a Dark Other party. They reach the hotel in the truck and he says "We made it", before slouching forward on to the car horn, supposedly dead. However, he is seen again at the end of the film, once Anton rewrites his own fate, back when he, Bear, and Tiger Cub were attempting to catch the witch at the beginning of the movie Night Watch. He speaks briefly to Anton, and tells his co-workers that Anton has become human again.

Tiger Cub/Yekaterina "Katya" Sorokina
 (Shifter-Mage) - a young, playful mage with a penchant for jewels and amulets. She is highly regarded both by Dark and Light Others. It is said that she can charm anyone. As the name implies, she shapeshifts to tiger as her preferred animal form. She has a large house riddled with secret passages and guarded by dogs trained to attack Others (normally animals are afraid of Others). She can be rather impulsive and vengeful, which gets her in trouble on several occasions.  The books make the distinction that she is a mage (originally a light healer) that has developed the ability to change form through study and practice rather than the normal forced transition of a werewolf. Day Watch (Book): She was killed by a powerful Dark "Mirror" Other, who crushed her with a spell.

Bear
 (Shifter-Mage) - a reclusive, quiet mage known for his calculated, brutal tactics. His preferred animal form is a large polar bear, although he can take any bear form. Due to his shady personality, he is often referred to as an ex-Dark Other (though his supposed former affiliation to the Dark Others proved to be wrong). He is frequently partnered with Tiger Cub. Night Watch (movie): his first name is Ilya and he is romantically involved with Tiger Cub. Day Watch (book): when Tiger Cub dies, he is largely saddened by her demise, which leads other operatives to think he had a crush on her.

Ignat
 (Light Incubus) - a self-absorbed mage with "[the] face of a Hollywood actor and the body of a Greek god". He prides himself on being able to bed any woman (or man). As a result, he takes failure very hard.  Night Watch (book and Russian version of the movie): He is called by Geser to attempt to seduce Svetlana, so she would relax the vortex or at least say who cursed her. However, he tries too hard and she figures him out. Day Watch (movie): his failure drove him to be downgraded to a simple archive guard. However, as seen in front of the hotel "Kosmos", he still has influence on other operatives, as he motivates them to attack before Olga stops him.

Garik
 (Light Mage) - a shy mage infamous for his bad luck with women.

Igor Teplov
 (Light Mage) - an idealistic mid-level mage. Despite his youthful appearance, he was born in the late 1920s. He is dedicated to the cause of Light Others, though his knee jerk reaction to Dark Others and refusal to compromise his principles has occasionally caused problems. Voluntarily dematerialized into the Twilight at the end of the events in the 2nd book, Day Watch.

Yulia
 (Light Mage) - a smart young girl who works at the Night Watch as an analytical sorceress. Yulia admires Tiger Cub.  Geser punishes her by forcing her to live as a regular human girl of her age for a week.

Ilya
 (Light Mage) - bespectacled first-level mage who swapped bodies with Geser in Story One: Destiny to trick Zavulon. He is said to be a powerful mage. He is good friends with Semyon. Although they are both first-level magicians, Ilya is hinted to be slightly more powerful.

Nadya Gorodetskaya
 (Absolute Light Sorceress) - Dusk Watch (Novel): daughter of Anton and Svetlana.  Two years old in Twilight Watch, five years old in Final Watch. Even at her young age, she's capable of feats few Light Others can match. In spite of the knowledge that comes with such power, she retains childlike innocence, which occasionally results in her using her powers without thinking of the consequences. She is a Zero-level Other - she does not emit magic, only absorb. In all the novels, there are only two Other's that had such a level: Merlin and Jesus (although he is only mentioned). Nadya was intended to be the Light Messiah, with help of Geser's manipulations with fate. However, due to Zavulon's intrigue, the only Light Other apparently able to be a teacher and mentor to a Messiah, voluntarily defleshed himself. Nadya is still going to become an incredibly powerful Light Sorceress, but it is not certain whether she will actually become Light Messiah. In New Watch, it's revealed that Nadya has the power to destroy Twilight itself and, by extension, all magic.

Foma (Thomas) Lermont
 (Grand Light Mage) - Final Watch (Novel): Once known as Thomas the Rhymer and is Mikhail Lermontov's ancestor, among other things. Head of Scottish Night Watch and friend of Geser.

Alexander "Las" Ulyanov

See below under Unaffiliated.

Alisher Ganiev
 (Light Mage) - Night Watch (novel): he comes from Uzbekistan and gives the Chalk of Fate to Geser, whom he respects for helping his father. Final Watch (Novel): he accompanies Anton to Uzbekistan to meet Rustam, even though he doesn't want to return. He reveals that his father was Geser's devona and a mentally challenged person, and that Geser helped him out by making him as smart as the others, but the spell wore off afterwards. Day Watch (Movie): he works in the Samarkand Night Watch and seems to be a friend of Anton's.

Dark Others 

Characters with Magical abilities that have aligned themselves with the Dark are called Dark Others (Selfishness):

Zavulon (Zabulon) 
 (Also spelled Zabulon) (Grand Dark Mage) - An ancient schemer about the same age as Geser. He runs the Day Watch in Moscow and his plans frequently involve misdirection and hidden agendas.  His power seems to rival that of Geser but he is often, if not overpowered by Geser, outwitted by him.  His true form has taken on demonic characteristics because he has spent a great deal of time in the Twilight. His chosen human appearance is often misleading, as he appears as a thin intellectual who does not seem to be a threat to those who do not know him.  Day Watch Novel: Geser's consistent ability to outwit him eventually forces the intangible forces of the Twilight World itself to restore the balance between Light and Dark. Face of the Dark Palmira: His human name is revealed to be Arthur.  The name "Zabulon" is from the Old Testament.

Alisa Donnikova
(Also spelled Alyssa and Alicia) (Dark Witch) - A young witch with a penchant for mischief and discreet mind manipulation. Night Watch (book): She was Zavulon's lover until the end of the Night Watch novel, when she is caught attempting to steal power through illicit means.  Night Watch (movie): she puts the vampire back on Yegor's track by giving her his goggles so she would "sniff him out like a starving dog". Later, she reads Daria's arrest report in front of Yegor, who, upon learning Anton tried to kill him before he was born, joins the Dark Others. Day Watch (book):  The first story of the book is told from her point of view. She and Zavulon have a brief rapprochement in the first part of the Day Watch novel, but it's not clear how sincere Zavulon is. She meets Igor Teplov at a camp by the Black Sea and both believe the other is a simple human being, and they fall for each other. But as their powers come back, they realize they are on opposite sides. Igor challenges Alisa and Alisa, not even trying to fight back, is drowned. She is later temporarily revived as a witness during the trial in the last part of the book. It's strongly implied (and believed by Alisa) that Zavulon was manipulating her to remove Igor from play. Day Watch (Movie): She is forced to be Zavulon's lover after he puts a ring on her finger. The ring makes Alisa and Zavulon linked and Alisa is unable to take it off. When Kostya dies, and a massive disaster hits Moscow, she gets rid of the ring by cutting her finger off and tries to revive Kostya with the Chalk of Fate, but to no avail.

Kostya (Konstantin) Saushkin
 (Vampire) - A young, idealistic vampire whom Anton befriended before becoming an Other.  Anton's actions during the first part of Night Watch drove a wedge between them.  Kostya was bitten by his father after he was born, in order to prevent him from succumbing to a fatal disease (pneumonia in both lungs), and has resented being a vampire ever since.  His goal is to study biology and find a cure for vampirism or at the very least find a way to make himself no different from everyone else.  Dusk Watch (Novel): Normally, a vampire must drink blood, and kill (completely) about 6-7 humans to become a High Vampire. Kostya has managed to become one by only drinking the "Saushkin Cocktail" - a special mix from blood of 12 donors, willingly given. Later, thanks to the Fuaran book, he becomes the most powerful Other in the world. In the same novel, is revealed that the final objective of Kostya was to use the Fuaran on the whole world by undergoing the ritual on board the International Space Station. Anton hijacks the shuttle take off, stranding him in space without chance to open a portal to teleport away. In a subsequent novel, it's told he was burnt reentering the atmosphere and his skeleton was recovered by the Night Watch. Day Watch (Movie): he has an affair with Alisa. When the Inquisitors take Kostya's father away, Kostya tries to attack Zavulon and is killed in a tango dance. As the result of Anton's use of the Chalk of Fate, however, he is most likely alive again at the end of the film.

Edgar
 (Dark Mage) - a strong Dark mage (1-2 level) who was transferred to Moscow from an Estonian Day Watch on Zavulon's behest. Although he was, for a while, a steadfast supporter of the Dark Other's cause, he found many aspects of the Dark Others' lifestyle distasteful. Between Day Watch (Novel) and Dusk Watch (Novel): After becoming tired of being a pawn in Zavulon's schemes, he joins the Inquisition. Final Watch (Novel): After his wife is killed, Edgar is overcome with sadness and finds out about Merlin's Crown of All Things, which he believes will resurrect Others who have withdrawn into the Twilight; he then joins the Last Watch in an attempt to obtain the Crown. He is killed by Arina when he requests to be "helped" to join his wife in the Twilight at the end of the novel.

Arina
 (Witch,  Grandmother of grandmothers, high other of the light, formerly high dark other.) 

Twilight Watch (Novel): She was involved in an experiment intended to create a perfect society, organised by both Watches together with the Inquisition, but she sabotaged it, together with an unknown Light Mage who is most likely Geser. Then she put herself to sleep for several decades, to wait out the hunt. Arina does most of her magic using plants and herbs. She chose darkness out of selfishness rather than any particular malice. She does not like to hurt people, although she will pretend she is willing to if it suits her goals.  She actively dislikes and disrespects Zavulon.  

Final Watch (Novel): She becomes a Higher Light Other and is one of the members of Final Watch trio.

New Watch (Novel): Arina becomes obsessed with prophecies and is determined to force Anton's hand to destroy Twilight itself, having decided that magic is evil. Anton strands her in the Sarcophagus of Time, but it's implied that she has a way out.

Sixth Watch (Novel):  The conclave of witches is incapable of choosing a new leader,  Grandmother of grandmothers, because their current leader (Arina) is still alive but inaccessible to everyone so after 10 years trapped in the Sarcophagus of Time she is visited by Anton who offers her a way out on the condition that she accepts to be part of the Sixth Watch in order to save the world from peril, Arina who confesses to have already lived through the same situation in the year 1914 accepts and eventually tells Anton the whole truth behind the Two-in-one. Eventually she confesses her love for Anton but decides to sacrifice him in order to save the world.

Gennadiy Saushkin
 (renamed as Valeriy Saushkin in the movies) (Vampire) - Kostya's father. When Kostya was little, Gennadiy had to turn him into a vampire, for fear of him dying from a fatal disease, then turned his mother as well. Night Watch (book): he still lives with Kostya and his wife, Polina, a floor above Anton's apartment. Final Watch (book): after mourning the loss of his son Kostya, and that of his wife Polina (who committed suicide when she learned Kostya was dead), he became obsessed with vengeance on Anton. He drank blood from 50 people to become a Great Vampire, then joined the Final Watch. Night Watch (Movie): he is a butcher and lives alone with his son in an apartment on the same floor as Anton. Day Watch (Movie): he is taken away by the Inquisition for having broken the Truce. He however reveals that Zavulon made him do this, in exchange for cancelling Kostya's blood license.

Inquisition 

The Inquisition is a policing group created by the treaty establishing détente between Light and Dark.  They are tasked with monitoring compliance with the treaty and meting out punishments for infractions.  Members are personally either Light or Dark as above, but owe their loyalty to the Inquisition and not one or another of the Watch organizations.

Maxim
 (Inquisitor) - Night Watch (book): a middle-class Light Other whose powers emerged before Night Watch could find him.  Maxim could sense evil in others around him, but was blind to good, leading him to see even people that were a mix of the two as completely evil. Because of this, he hunted and killed low-level Dark Others. Upon discovering the truth about the Others, he joined the Inquisition on the suggestion of Geser.

Witezislav
 (also spelled Vitezislav or Vítězslav surname Hrubín) (High Vampire, Inquisitor) - an old vampire who got tired of Zavulon and Day Watch and joined the Inquisition. He and Geser share a long-standing animosity for each other. According to Geser, when Vitezislav became a vampire, he killed his own mother, though it was not intended. In Twilight Watch, he discovers the Fuaran hidden by Arina and tests it on Kostya, who becomes a Higher Vampire and kills Witezislav to get hold of the book for himself.

Edgar
 See under Dark Others just above.  Dusk Watch: While Maxim divorced his wife when he joined the Inquisition, Edgar married a witch.

Unnamed Inquisitor twins
 (only seen in the movies) (Inquisitors) - Night Watch (movie): when Geser and Zavulon forge the Truce, a young man is standing in the middle. While Geser and Zavulon speak, the young man's face changes as he grows older, becoming the first Inquisitor. Day Watch (movie): Two men identical to the first Inquisitor are featured in the movie (it can be only speculated if the first Inquisitor is one of them, if he was somehow divided in two, or if all Others who join the Inquisition take that form). They are old, both leaning on a walking stick, calm, serious and seemingly emotionless. They seem linked, as one of them can finish the other one's sentences. They show very developed powers when one of them throws an eavesdropping Anatoliy across the corridor with a mere look.

Unaffiliated

Yegor (Egor)
 (spelled Egor in the Andrew Bromfield English translation) - a shy, seemingly ordinary young boy. Night Watch (Book and Movie): He was ambushed by a pair of renegade vampires in the beginning of Night Watch and is rescued by Anton. However, Anton has to save him again as the female vampire is back on his track. Night Watch (Book): Yegor is a very rare case, having a 'clean slate'. His aura shows his fate to be undetermined. In the second part of Night Watch, it is revealed that Yegor is destined to join the side of the Dark. However, at the very end of the novel his destiny is partially re-written and he remains unaffiliated. His potential mage level is very low (6 or 7). Day Watch (Novel): he is briefly seen on a subway train by the Mirror Vitaliy Rogoza, when the latter is on his way to an Inquisition tribunal. Final Watch (Novel): he meets with Anton on the way to Edinburgh and once again when there. It is revealed that an unaffiliated mage is a potential Mirror (just like Vitaly Ragoza) and Anton fears Yegor could become one. Night Watch (Movie):  Being Anton's son in the movie, Yegor willingly joins the Dark Others, as Anton admits he wanted to kill him as an unborn child because he believed he wasn't his son and an obstacle from getting his wife back. Day Watch (Movie): He became very powerful (a match for Svetlana) and there is much concern that if and when the two begin to fight, Moscow will be destroyed. However, when this happens and Anton uses the Chalk of Fate to turn time back to 1992, he chooses not to kill Yegor, and the latter's future remains undetermined.

Vitaliy Ragoza
 (Spelled Vitaly Rogoza in the American Edition and in the original Russian edition) (The Mirror) - Day Watch (novel): a minor Other from Mykolaiv, Ukraine, who was not associated with either side, but was turned into the Mirror by the Gloom itself in order to correct the imbalance between the Night Watch and Day Watch in Moscow. As the Mirror, he had an ability to match the power level of any Other he was combating at the time. In the span of two weeks, he killed Tiger Cub and drained Svetlana's power. It was stated at the end of his story that he had become the most powerful other on Earth.  He only possessed this level of power for a few minutes after completing his mission, at which point he was absorbed into the twilight/gloom.  Vitaliy realized that, in restoring the balance between the light and the dark, he had attained a level of power so great as to be a threat to that balance.  In a later novel Final Watch, it is stated that a low-level neutral Other is required to become a Mirror. He was the narrator of the second story of Day Watch.

Rustam
 (Grand Light Mage) - Final Watch: Rustam is an ancient mage, a contemporary of Merlin, with whom he was friends. He was also a close friend of Gesar once, but they fell out later. Rustam finally became a recluse, after he lost interest in the world. He moved permanently to the Gloom (but he did not disperse in it), visiting the reality only occasionally - for those purposes he borrows the body of Afandi, a relatively low-level old Other he once initiated. Rustam lives close to the Plane of Demons, a place where once he and Geser fought a war against Dark Others and used a spell so terrible that no one ever dared to use it since. That spell caused disruption in all levels of the Gloom, causing the opposing mages not to vanish into the Gloom, but to turn to stone in the real world, remaining alive but immobile and without any senses. They were released from their prison by Anton Gorodetsky, thanks to the power of the Crown of All.

Merlin
 Final Watch (novel): one of the few zero-level mages who ever lived. He left many artifacts and spells, including the one Gesar and Rustam used on the Plain of Demons. He was the only Other who changed his affiliation (going from Light to Dark), until Arina. Apart from other artifacts and spells, he left behind the Crown Of All Things, a deep seated philosophy in which all the levels of Twilight were connected via a grandiose loop, or "crown", hidden in the deepest level of the Twilight, and protected by carefully set obstacles and guardians.

Alexander "Las" Ulyanov

 Dusk Watch (novel): Normal human heavy metal bass player that Anton encounters while undercover in Dusk Watch.  Anton's apartment has no toilet, Las's has no shower.  As he has always been attracted to the strange and fantastic (and probably familiar with hallucinogens), he is unfazed by seeing magic used around him.  He is eventually given powers by Kostya as a demonstration and joins the Night Watch. This character is based on a real Russian musician, Alexander "Las" Ulyanov.

Zoar

 Day Watch (Movie): besides the Inquisitor twins, he is the only key character present in a Watch movie, but absent from the pentalogy. Back to Tamerlane's age, he was the keeper of the Chalk of Fate in an impenetrable fortress in North Iran, until Tamerlane found the Chalk, and Zoar didn't oppose him owning it. Zoar even became Tamerlane's right-hand man. When Tamerlane died, he was buried in Samarkand, Uzbekistan, and Zoar remained there as a member of the government. He saw Olga during one of expeditions and warned her that if Tamerlane's tomb is opened, a war would start, but was disobeyed. Prior to the events of the movie, he moved to Moscow and started a restaurant, keeping a low profile and using the Chalk to write prices on a blackboard. When Anton discovers Zoar has the Chalk, Zoar gladly gives it to him. He seems to personally know Geser.

Night Watch